Wetlook clothing is that which looks shiny and thus appears to be wet. The term wetlook also refers to the act of getting wet while wearing clothes, and the enjoyment of having oneself or others do so, often as a form of sexual excitement.

As sexual stimuli
Alex Comfort writing in The Joy of Sex suggested that wetlook clothing functions as a kind of superskin, enhancing the visual and tactile qualities of shininess and tightness. He offered the 1970s-style advice that if your lover "likes you to look like a cross between a snake and a seal, wear what he gives you".

For Desmond Morris, water on the skin is seen as mimicking the sweat of sexual arousal.

On the Internet, several companies sell images or videos of hobbyists or models practicing wet look. There are two schools: sites that sell erotic content and sites that target the general public that sell soft images suitable for any audience.

Fashion and pop
The 1960s success of the Merseybeat saw wetlook PVC coats coming down from Liverpool to enter the London fashion scene.  A few decades later, a pop ladette might feel ambivalent to find herself posing in a PVC catsuit.

Classical prototypes
 New Kingdom of Egypt poetry has a girl telling her lover: "It is pleasant to go to the pool...That I may let you see my beauty in my tunic of finest royal linen When it is wet".
 Foam-born Aphrodite rising from the waves—Aphrodite Anadyomene—initiated a long sequence of similar wetlook images.

See also

References

Further reading 
  See the "Clothes" and "Wet look" entries.

External links 
 

Sexual fetishism